The 1994 Florida Gators baseball team represented the University of Florida in the sport of baseball during the 1994 college baseball season.  The Gators competed in Division I of the National Collegiate Athletic Association (NCAA) and the Eastern Division of the Southeastern Conference (SEC).  They played their home games at Alfred A. McKethan Stadium, on the university's Gainesville, Florida campus. The team was coached by Joe Arnold, who was in his 11th and final season at Florida.

Roster

References

Florida
Florida Gators baseball seasons
Florida Gators baseball